Javiera Villagra Lira (born 17 March 1983) is a former field hockey player from Chile, who played as a midfielder.

Personal life
Javiera Villagra was born and raised in Santiago, Chile.

Career

College sport
In 2003, Villagra travelled to the United States to play college sport for American University in Washington. She was a member of the AU Eagles until 2005. She was named an All–American on three occasions by the NFHCA.

Las Diablas
Villagra made her debut for Las Diablas in 1997, at just 14 years of age.

Following her debut, Villagra was a mainstay in the national team for 18 years, until her retirement in 2015 following the Pan American Games.

Throughout her career, Villagra medalled many times, most notably winning bronze at both the 2009 Pan American Cup in Hamilton, and the 2011 Pan American Games in Guadalajara.

References

External links

Javiera Villagra at American University

1983 births
Living people
Chilean female field hockey players
Female field hockey forwards
Pan American Games bronze medalists for Chile
Pan American Games medalists in field hockey
Field hockey players at the 2011 Pan American Games
Competitors at the 2006 South American Games
Competitors at the 2014 South American Games
South American Games silver medalists for Chile
South American Games medalists in field hockey
Medalists at the 2011 Pan American Games
20th-century Chilean women
21st-century Chilean women